Nicholas Blundell (1669 – 1737), sometimes styled "of Crosby", lord of the manor of Little Crosby, was an English landowner seated at Crosby Hall, Lancashire, and is best known for his diaries which provide first-hand insight into the life of 18th-century English gentry.

Family 
Devoutly Catholic since the Middle Ages, the Blundells were among the leading English recusant landed gentry prior to Catholic Emancipation in the 19th century, and progenitors of various cadet branches including the Weld-Blundell family.

Life 
The eldest son and heir of William Blundell, also known as "the Cavalier" (being a Knight of Malta) for his exploits during the English Civil War, Nicholas Blundell's notebook was first published in 1880 by the Revd. T. E. Gibson. A Cavalier’s Note Book and was referenced by Lady Antonia Fraser in her work on English 17th-century women, The Weaker Vessel (Phoenix Press, London, 2002 paperback, originally published 1984).

Blundell married The Hon. Frances Langdale and had two daughters, the younger of whom, Frances (Mrs Henry Peppard), reassumed the surname and arms of Blundell by Royal Licence upon succeeding to the ancestral estates. Nicholas Blundell's descendants through her remain seated at Crosby Hall, now in Merseyside.

Sources
Three volumes of Blundell's Diaries were produced by Frank Tyrer and J. J. Bagley and published by the Record Society of Lancashire & Cheshire between 1968 and 1972.

 The great diurnal of Nicholas Blundell volume 1 : 1702-1711 (1968)
 The great diurnal of Nicholas Blundell volume 2 : 1712-1719 (1970)
 The great diurnal of Nicholas Blundell volume 3 : 1720-1728 (1972)
 A volume Blundell’s diary & letter book 1702-1728 was published in 1952. Edited by Margaret Blundell (Liverpool University Press, Liverpool, 1952).
 A secondary source is J. J. Bagley, Historical importance of Nicholas Blundell's diurnal, 1972.

See also 
 Crosby Hall
 Catholic Record Society

References

Bibliography 

 Crosby, Alan G. (2004). "Blundell, Nicholas (1669–1737)". In Oxford Dictionary of National Biography. Oxford: Oxford UP, n.p.

External links 
 Burke's Landed Gentry
 Blundell's Diary @ www.archive.org

1669 births
1737 deaths
English diarists
Blundell
Nobility of the United Kingdom
English Roman Catholics
18th-century English non-fiction writers
18th-century English male writers
18th-century English writers